Janelly Farias Rodríguez (born February 12, 1990) is an American-born Mexican professional footballer who plays as centre-back for Liga MX Femenil club Pachuca. She participated in Exatlon Estados Unidos season 1 and was a  Commentator/Analyst for the 2019 FIFA Women’s World Cup for Telemundo. She uses her platform to promote inclusivity and advocate for LGBT+ persons. She is openly gay.

Club career
After publicly coming out as lesbian while playing college soccer, the rejection she suffered from her family originally led her to quit football. After a few years, however, during which her family gradually reconnected with her and in which she was inspired by the 2015 FIFA Women's World Cup, she made the decision to return to the sport.

On 28 June 2019, Farías joined Liga MX Femenil side CD Guadalajara.

International career
Farías represented Mexico at the 2006 FIFA U-20 Women's World Championship. She made her senior debut on 1 April 2007. She is currently on the full women’s Mexico national team and looking to participate in the 2020 Olympic qualifying CONCACAF TOURNAMENT.

Personal life
Farias is openly lesbian. She actively advocates for equality and uses her platform to promote visibility and empowerment for the LGBT+ community. In October 2020, she led a talk for Harvard University titled "Navigating the Borders of Gender, Culture, Language, and Sexuality in Sports and Beyond."

References

External links
 
 
 

1990 births
Living people
Citizens of Mexico through descent
Mexican women's footballers
Women's association football central defenders
Women's association football midfielders
Mexico women's international footballers
Apollon Ladies F.C. players
Liga MX Femenil players
C.D. Guadalajara (women) footballers
Mexican expatriate women's footballers
Mexican expatriate sportspeople in Cyprus
Expatriate women's footballers in Cyprus
Lesbian sportswomen
LGBT association football players
Mexican LGBT sportspeople
American women's soccer players
Soccer players from California
Sportspeople from Santa Ana, California
American sportspeople of Mexican descent
New Mexico Lobos women's soccer players
UC Irvine Anteaters women's soccer players
American LGBT sportspeople
LGBT people from California
American expatriate women's soccer players
American expatriate sportspeople in Cyprus